Tubulin, delta 1 is a protein in humans that is encoded by the TUBD1 gene.

References

Further reading